Gustavo Adolfo Lluberes (born 1913) was a Dominican pitcher who played in the Negro leagues in the 1930s.

A native of Santo Domingo, Dominican Republic, Lluberes played for the Cuban Stars (East) in 1936 and returned to the club the following season.

References

External links
Baseball statistics and player information from Baseball-Reference Black Baseball Stats and Seamheads

1913 births
Date of birth missing
Year of death missing
Cuban Stars (East) players
Dominican Republic baseball players
Baseball pitchers
Sportspeople from Santo Domingo
Dominican Republic people of Catalan descent
White Dominicans